Wilhelm Rink von Baldenstein was the Prince-Bishop of Basel from 1608 to 1628.

References

Prince-Bishops of Basel